Richard Bell may refer to:

Politics
Richard Bell (died c. 1417), English Member of Parliament
Richard Bell (British politician) (1859–1930), British Labour Member of Parliament and trade unionist
Dick Bell (1913–1988), Canadian Member of Parliament
Richard Bell (Georgia judge) (1920–2005), associate justice of the Supreme Court of Georgia
Richard Bell (Virginia politician) (born 1946), member of the Virginia House of Delegates

Music
Richard Bell (musician) (1946–2007), member of the Band
Richard Bell (aka Fast Dick), guitarist with Crazyhead
Richard Bell (record producer), Jamaican record producer

Sport
 Dick Bell (footballer), Scottish footballer
 Richard Bell (American football) (born 1967), NFL running back
 Richard Bell (coach) (born 1937), former head football coach at the University of South Carolina
 Richard Bell (cricketer) (1874–1953), English cricketer

Others
 Richard Bell (actor) (1672), English stage actor
Richard Bell (Arabist) (1876–1952), Scottish Arabic scholar
Richard Bell (artist) (born 1953), Aboriginal Australian artist and activist
Richard Bell (bishop) (died 1496), Bishop of Carlisle from 1477 to 1495
Richard Bell (director) (born 1975), Canadian screenwriter and director
Richard K. Bell, American ambassador
Richard Williams Bell (1811–1857), American author who reportedly saw events caused by Bell Witch

See also
Ricky Bell (disambiguation)